The Lynk & Co 09 is a five-door mid-size luxury SUV from the Chinese marque Lynk & Co. The model has been developed in conjunction with Volvo Cars and shares the Volvo SPA platform of the second generation Volvo XC90, both companies owned by Geely.

Overview

The Lynk & Co 09 was unveiled on the 19 June 2021 in Shanghai, positioned as a mid-size SUV. The 09 is manufactured in the Meishu plant in Ningbo, China.

Interior
Customers will get an option to configure the 09 with six or seven seats. The top of the trim configuration of the Lynk & Co 09 is equipped with 12-way power front seats, wireless smartphone charger, AR navigation, active noise reduction system, Nappa leather upholstery, and an aromatherapy system with three modes. The package also offers Level 2 and Level 3 autonomous driving functions providing High-speed Automatic Lane Change, automatic parking, and low-speed congestion pilot function.

Powertrain
Three powertrain setups are available. A mild hybrid with a 2.0 liter turbo engine mated to an Aisin 8-speed automatic gearbox and recuperation with a 48 volt battery. A hybrid with an electric motor to assist the petrol engine, with a battery that can be charged only by regeneration when breaking and by the ICE (internal combustion) engine. A PHEV (plug-in hybrid electric vehicle) with an engine and battery that can be charged by plugging it into the charging port. The powertrains develop  based on configuration with another  coming from rear electric motors, and all variants are four-wheel drive with BorgWarner supplying the AWD system.

References

Cars of China
09